Anson High School is a public high school located in Anson, Texas and classified as a 3A school by the UIL. It is part of the Anson Independent School District and located in central Jones County. In 2015, the school was rated "Met Standard" by the Texas Education Agency.

Athletics
The Anson Tigers compete in cross country, football, basketball, powerlifting, golf, tennis, track, baseball, and softball.

Notable alumni
Lou Halsell Rodenberger (September 21, 1926 – April 9, 2009) was a Texas author, educator, professor and journalist.

References

External links
Anson ISD

Public high schools in Texas
Schools in Jones County, Texas